USS Harvard (SP-209) was a yacht leased by the U.S. Navy during World War I. She was outfitted as a patrol craft and assigned to patrol duty in the North Atlantic Ocean, protecting civilian ships from German submarines. In addition, she saved the lives of a number of survivors from ships that had been torpedoed. Post-war she was decommissioned and returned to her owner in her original civilian shipboard configuration.

Construction 

The second ship to be named Harvard by the U.S. Navy, the vessel was a steel yacht, was built as Eleanor by Bath Iron Works, Bath, Maine, for William A. Slater in 1894.  She was sold to G F Baker and renamed the  Wacouta then leased by the Navy from G. F. Baker, New York, New York, 23 April 1917. Waoouta was renamed Harvard and commissioned 10 May 1917 at New York City.

World War I service

Assigned to the North Atlantic 
 
After being fitted out for overseas service, Harvard departed New York City 9 June 1917 with a convoy, and arrived at Brest, France, 4 July.

She then engaged in patrol duties out of Brest, and on 16 July picked up 59 survivors from the ill-fated British steamship Trelissick. Trelissiok had been torpedoed and sunk 15 July, after having rescued some 30 men from another torpedoed British ship, Exford, the day before. Harvard returned the survivors from both ships safely to Brest.
 
Continuing her duties around Brest, Harvard performed as a harbor patrol and coastal convoy ship. She assisted the torpedoed merchantman Texas 29 November 1917 and searched for survivors of the sinking of Hundaago, a Norwegian steamship, 4 August 1918.

Post-war return to owner 
 
Harvard departed for England 21 November 1918 and remained there until June 1919, when she returned to New York City via Bermuda. The yacht was decommissioned and turned over to her owner 26 July 1919.

References

  
 USS Harvard (SP-209), 1917-1919

Steam yachts
Ships built in Bath, Maine
World War I patrol vessels of the United States
1904 ships